Nassarius candens, common name the bright nassa, is a species of sea snail, a marine gastropod mollusk in the family Nassariidae, the Nassa mud snails or dog whelks.

Description
The shell size varies between 12 mm and 21 mm

Distribution
This species occurs in the Pacific Ocean along the Marquesas Islands

References

 Cernohorsky W. O. (1984). Systematics of the family Nassariidae (Mollusca: Gastropoda). Bulletin of the Auckland Institute and Museum 14: 1–356

External links
 

Nassariidae
Gastropods described in 1844